Andorno may refer to:

 Andorno Micca, a municipality  in the Province of Biella in the Italian region Piedmont, 
 Andorno Station, a historic stagecoach station and hotel site near Winnemucca, Nevada

People 

 Nikola Biller-Andorno, a German bioethicist
 Roberto Andorno, Associate Professor at the Faculty of Law, University of Zurich, Switzerland